Repose is a word meaning "rest" or "calmness".

Repose may also refer to:
Lying in repose, when the body of a deceased person is set out for public viewing
Dying, particularly used of saints in the Eastern Orthodox Church
Mount Repose (disambiguation), several mountains
USS Repose, several US Navy ships
Repose (painting), a c.1871 painting by Édouard Manet